Oreste Conte (19 July 1919 – 7 October 1956) was an Italian racing cyclist. He rode in the 1948 Tour de France.

Major results

1939
1st Coppa San Geo
1941
1st Coppa San Geo
1944
1st Coppa Bernocchi
1946
1st Stages 11, 16a & 17 Giro d'Italia
2nd Milano–Torino
1947
1st Stages 7 & 11 Giro d'Italia
1st Milano–Modena
1948
1st Stages 12 & 14 Giro d'Italia
1949
1st Stages 12 & 16 Giro d'Italia
1950
1st Stages 1 & 18 Giro d'Italia
3rd Milan–San Remo
1952
1st Stage 2 Deutschland Tour
1st Stages 12 Giro d'Italia
2nd Milano–Torino
1953
1st Stages 12 Giro d'Italia

References

External links
 

1919 births
1956 deaths
Italian male cyclists
Sportspeople from Udine
Cyclists from Friuli Venezia Giulia